Einar Thorvaldsson (1902 – 1967) was an Icelandic chess player, two-times Icelandic Chess Championship winner (1928, 1940).

Biography
From the end of 1920s to the begin of 1940s, Einar was one of the leading Icelandic chess players. He twice won the Icelandic Chess Championship: in 1928 and in 1940.

Einar played for Iceland in the Chess Olympiads:
 In 1930, at third board in the 3rd Chess Olympiad in Hamburg (+4, =7, -6),
 In 1933, at third board in the 5th Chess Olympiad in Folkestone (+2, =5, -7),
 In 1939, at fourth board in the 8th Chess Olympiad in Buenos Aires (+3, =4, -3).

Einar played for Iceland in the unofficial Chess Olympiad:
 In 1936, at third board in the 3rd unofficial Chess Olympiad in Munich (+4, =5, -10).

References

External links

Einar Þorvaldsson chess games at 365chess.com

1902 births
1967 deaths
Icelandic chess players
Chess Olympiad competitors
20th-century chess players